Ronald William Gill (16 June 1917 – 3 September 1965) was an Australian rugby league footballer who played in the 1940s.

Playing career
Born at Ulmarra, New South Wales, Gill was one of the finest wingers to ever come from the Clarence River, New South Wales area. He represented Clarence River in 1937 and Newcastle in 1938.
After enlisting in the Australian Army in 1942, Gill was stationed to the St. George area and played one season with St. George in 1943 in which he scored 7 tries in 16 games, and he also represented N.S.W. Country Firsts in 1943.

After the war ended. Gill returned to Newcastle football and played with Ulmarra R.L.F.C until the early 1950s.

Death
Gill died in Newcastle, New South Wales on 3 September 1965.

References

1917 births
1965 deaths
Australian Army personnel of World War II
Australian Army soldiers
Australian rugby league players
Country New South Wales rugby league team players
Rugby league players from New South Wales
Rugby league wingers
St. George Dragons players